Calvin Schrage (born 1991) is an American politician from Alaska. He has represented District 25 as a Member of the Alaska House of Representatives since 2021.

Education 
Schrage graduated from University of Alaska Anchorage.

Political career 
Schrage was re-elected in 2022, and elected House Minority Leader.

Personal life 
Schrage is married.

References

External links 

 Official website
 Calvin Schrage at Ballotpedia

1991 births
21st-century American politicians
Alaska Independents
Living people
Members of the Alaska House of Representatives
University of Alaska Anchorage alumni